Northeastern Railroad may refer to:
North Eastern Rail Road (Georgia), 1854-1895, predecessor of the Southern Railway
Northeastern Railroad (South Carolina), 1851-1898, predecessor of the Atlantic Coast Line Railroad